Philipp Heyden (born 26 September 1988) is a former German professional basketball player who last played for Academics Heidelberg of the Basketball Bundesliga.

References

External links
German League Profile 
Basketball-Reference.com Profile 
Eurobasket.com Profile

1988 births
Living people
Centers (basketball)
German men's basketball players
Medi Bayreuth players
Mitteldeutscher BC players
People from Marbach am Neckar
Sportspeople from Stuttgart (region)
Riesen Ludwigsburg players
Tigers Tübingen players
USC Heidelberg players
VfL Kirchheim Knights players